Zhang Dingfa (8 December 1943 – 14 December 2006) was a submariner and admiral of China's People's Liberation Army Navy (PLAN), who served as Commander of the PLAN from 2003 to 2006. Prior to that, he served as President of the PLA Academy of Military Science and Commander of the North Sea Fleet.

Zhang became the PLA Navy commander in the aftermath of the fatal submarine 361 accident in 2003. He initiated reforms to improve maintenance and training of the naval force, but stepped down three years later because of cancer, and died soon afterwards.

Early life and career
Zhang Dingfa was born on 8 December 1943 to a workers' family in Pudong, Shanghai. After graduating from Yangsi High School, he was admitted to the PLAN Submarine Academy in 1960. He joined the Communist Party of China in March 1964.

After graduating from the Submarine Academy in July 1964, Zhang joined the PLAN's submarine force, and participated in the development of China's nuclear submarines. He became a deputy submarine commander in 1971, and commander in 1975.

In August 1985, Zhang became chief of staff of the Qingdao Naval Base of the PLAN's North Sea Fleet, and he attained the rank of rear admiral in June 1991. He was then promoted to chief of staff of the North Sea Fleet in 1993, deputy commander in 1995, and commander of the North Sea Fleet and concurrently deputy commander of the Jinan Military Region in 1996. He became a vice admiral in July 1998, and a deputy commander of the PLA Navy in December 2000.

In November 2002, Zhang was appointed president of the PLA Academy of Military Science, the first naval officer to hold the position.

Command of the PLA Navy
Following a fatal accident with the Type 035 Ming-class submarine 361 in April 2003, Admiral Shi Yunsheng was removed from his position as Commander of the PLA Navy. Zhang Dingfa was chosen as his replacement partly because of his background as a career submariner, in an era when the PLA Navy was relying on its submarines in the event of a possible conflict with the United States over the Taiwan Strait issue. In September 2004, he was promoted to the rank of admiral, and became a member of the Central Military Commission (CMC). He was the first naval commander to become a CMC member.

As commander, Zhang initiated steps to reform the PLA Navy in the aftermath of the Ming 361 accident, including reorganizing the chain of command to improve accountability for maintenance and emphasizing training for more realistic scenarios. After serving for three years, however, Zhang was forced to step down in August 2006 because of terminal cancer. He was replaced by Admiral Wu Shengli, who continued his reforms.

Death

On 14 December 2006, Zhang Dingfa died in Beijing. President Hu Jintao and Vice President Zeng Qinghong were among those who attended his funeral. He was cremated and buried at the Babaoshan Revolutionary Cemetery.

References

1943 births
2006 deaths
People's Liberation Army generals from Shanghai
Commanders of the People's Liberation Army Navy
Submarine commanders
Deaths from cancer in the People's Republic of China
Commanders of the North Sea Fleet